IN-10, IN 10, or IN10 may refer to:

 Indiana's 10th congressional district
 Indiana State Road 10